Carolina ("Carry") Cornelia Catharina Geijssen (born 11 January 1947) is a former speed skater from the Netherlands.

Carry Geijssen won silver at the Dutch Allround Championships in 1965 (a feat she would repeat in 1967 and 1968). In 1966, she became Dutch Allround Champion. At the 1968 World Allround Championships in Helsinki, she won bronze behind Stien Kaiser and Ans Schut, making the podium entirely Dutch.

Geijssen then participated in the 1968 Winter Olympics in Grenoble, where she became Olympic Champion on the 1,000 m in a new Olympic record time. This made her the first Dutch Olympic Champion in speed skating in Olympic history. The next day, Ans Schut (on the 3,000 m) would become the second, while Kees Verkerk (on the 1,500 m) would become the third Dutch Olympic Champion in speed skating four days after that. Geijssen went on to win Olympic silver on the 1,500 m, just 0.3 seconds behind winner Kaija Mustonen.

After that, Geijssen remained active for several more years, but did not have any more major results. She ended her speed skating career in 1971. She married the cyclist Rien Langkruis, and later lived in Indonesia and Canada.

She is the younger sister of speed skater Bep Geijssen.

Medals
An overview of medals won by Carry Geijssen at important championships she participated in, listing the years in which she won each:

Records
Over the course of her career, Geijssen skated two Dutch Senior records in women's speed skating and a total of 19 Junior records (one doubling as both Senior and Junior record):

References

Notes

Bibliography

 Bal, Rien and Van Dijk, Rob. Schaatskampioenen, alles over het seizoen 68-69 (in Dutch). Amsterdam, the Netherlands: N.V. Het Parool, 1969.
 Bijlsma, Hedman with Tom Dekkers; Arie van Erk; Gé du Maine; Hans Niezen; Nol Terwindt and Karel Verbeek. Schaatsseizoen '96-'97: 25e Jaargang 1996-1997, statistische terugblik. Assen, the Netherlands: Stichting Schaatsseizoen, 1997. ISSN 0922-9582.
 Eng, Trond. All Time International Championships, Complete Results: 1889 - 2002. Askim, Noorwegen: WSSSA-Skøytenytt, 2002.
 Froger, Fred R. Winnaars op de schaats, Een Parool Sportpocket (in Dutch). Amsterdam, the Netherlands: N.V. Het Parool, 1968.
 Koomen, Theo. 10 Jaar Topschaatsen (in Dutch). Laren(NH), the Netherlands: Uitgeverij Luitingh, 1971. .
 Kleine, Jan. Schaatsjaarboek 1964 (in Dutch). Deventer, the Netherlands, 1964.
 Kleine, Jan. Schaatsjaarboek 1965 (in Dutch). Deventer, the Netherlands, 1965.
 Kleine, Jan. Schaatsjaarboek 1966, alles over het hardrijden op de schaats (in Dutch). Amsterdam, the Netherlands: Drukkerij Dico, 1966.
 Kleine, Jan. Schaatsjaarboek 1967/68, alles over het hardrijden op de lange baan (in Dutch). Amsterdam, the Netherlands: Drukkerij Dico, 1967.
 Kleine, Jan. Schaatsjaarboek 1968/69, alles over het hardrijden op de lange baan (in Dutch). Amsterdam, the Netherlands: Drukkerij Dico, 1968.
 Kleine, Jan. Schaatsjaarboek 1969-'70, alles over het hardrijden op de lange baan (in Dutch). Ede, the Netherlands, 1969.
 Kleine, Jan. Schaatsjaarboek 1970-'71, alles over het hardrijden op de lange baan (in Dutch). Nijmegen, the Netherlands: Schaatsjaarboek, 1970.
 Kleine, Jan. Schaatsjaarboek 1971-'72, alles over het hardrijden op de lange baan (in Dutch). Nijmegen, the Netherlands: Schaatsjaarboek, 1971.
 Maaskant, Piet. Flitsende Ijzers, De geschiedenis van de schaatssport (in Dutch). Zwolle, the Netherlands: La Rivière & Voorhoeve, 1967 (2nd revised and extended edition).
 Maaskant, Piet. Heya, Heya! Het nieuwe boek van de Schaatssport (in Dutch). Zwolle, the Netherlands: La Rivière & Voorhoeve, 1970.
 Peereboom, Klaas. Van Jaap Eden tot Ard Schenk (in Dutch). Baarn, the Netherlands: De Boekerij, 1972. .
 Teigen, Magne. Komplette Resultater Internasjonale Mesterskap 1889 - 1989: Menn/Kvinner, Senior/Junior, allround/sprint (in Norwegian). Veggli, Norway: WSSSA-Skøytenytt, 1989.
 Van Eyle, Wim. Een Eeuw Nederlandse Schaatssport (in Dutch). Utrecht, the Netherlands: Uitgeverij Het Spectrum, 1982. .

External links
Carry Geijssen at SpeedSkatingStats.com
Carry Geijssen at SchaatsStatistieken.nl (Dutch)

1947 births
Dutch female speed skaters
Speed skaters at the 1968 Winter Olympics
Olympic speed skaters of the Netherlands
Olympic medalists in speed skating
Medalists at the 1968 Winter Olympics
Olympic gold medalists for the Netherlands
Olympic silver medalists for the Netherlands
Sportspeople from Amsterdam
Living people
World Allround Speed Skating Championships medalists